Alan Peter Slough (24 September 1947 – 22 March 2021) was an English professional footballer who played as a midfielder in the Football League from the 1960s to 1980s, notably with Luton Town.

Career
Slough signed for the local team Luton Town in 1965 and went on to make 275 league appearances for the club over eight years before moving on to Fulham. After 154 league matches for Fulham, he joined Peterborough United for a transfer fee of £25,000, making 128 appearances in all competitions over four years. After a short spell at Millwall, he ended his career with a period with non-League Weymouth.

Death
Slough died on 22 March 2021, aged 73, following a battle with Parkinson's disease.

References

1947 births
2021 deaths
English footballers
Association football midfielders
English Football League players
Luton Town F.C. players
Fulham F.C. players
Peterborough United F.C. players
Millwall F.C. players
Weymouth F.C. players
FA Cup Final players